Mokhovoye is a rural locality (a settlement) in Zelenogradsky District of Kaliningrad Oblast, Russia, less than 4 km from Zelenogradsk and from the southwestern corner of the Curonian Lagoon. About 320 people live there.

Kaup is the name of a hill immediately north, where a large burial site with Scandinavian grave goods was found. It was important in early medieval history as a likely starting point of the Amber Road to the south.

External links 
Annual Viking festival in Mokhovoye 

Rural localities in Kaliningrad Oblast
Zelenogradsky District